Hollow Inside may refer to:
"Hollow Inside", a song by Buzzcocks from the album A Different Kind of Tension
"Hollow Inside", a song by Enslaved from the album Monumension
"Hollow Inside", a song by the Mighty Lemon Drops from the album World Without End